Roger Chamberlain is a Minnesota politician.

Roger Chamberlain may also refer to:

Roger Chamberlain (fl. 1414), MP for Huntingdon (UK Parliament constituency)
Roger Chamberlain (fl. 1450), MP for Suffolk (UK Parliament constituency)